Albert Phillip Al McKay (born February 2, 1948) is an American guitarist, songwriter, and record producer. He is a former member of The Watts 103rd Rhythm Street Band and Earth, Wind & Fire, for which he was inducted into the Rock and Roll Hall of Fame in 2000. McKay now leads his own group called the Al McKay All Stars.

Biography
Born and raised in New Orleans, Louisiana, United States, McKay's first professional gig was as a guitarist for the Ike & Tina Turner Revue. He then went on to become a member of The Watts 103rd Rhythm Street Band. McKay later joined up with the band Earth, Wind & Fire in 1973. He eventually left the group in 1981.

McKay now performs with his band, The Al McKay Allstars, performing a show called The Earth, Wind & Fire Experience. During 2001, the group released a studio album entitled Al Dente. A live album called Live at Mt. Fuji was also issued in 2003.

Solo work
Mc Kay also played on Gene Harris's 1976 album In a Special Way, Eddie Henderson's 1977 LP Comin' Through, Patrice Rushen's 1977 LP Shout It Out, 1978's Patrice, 1979's Pizzazz and her 1980 studio album, Posh. As well, McKay performed on Ramsey Lewis' 1980 LP Routes, Herbie Hancock's 1981 album Magic Windows and A Taste of Honey's 1982 LP Ladies of the Eighties. McKay also co-produced The Temptations on their 1984 studio LP Truly for You, and produced Shirley Jones on her 1986 album, Always in the Mood.

He later played upon Norman Brown's 1992 album Just Between Us and on Ramsey Lewis' 1993 LP Sky Islands.

References

External links
 videoartsmusic.com

1948 births
Living people
Rhythm and blues musicians from New Orleans
African-American guitarists
African-American record producers
Record producers from Louisiana
African-American songwriters
Songwriters from Louisiana
American session musicians
Earth, Wind & Fire members
Kings of Rhythm members
Ike & Tina Turner members
Guitarists from Louisiana
American male guitarists
20th-century American guitarists